is a passenger railway station located in the city of Fujisawa, Kanagawa, Japan and operated by the private railway operator Odakyu Electric Railway.

Lines
It lies 53.6 kilometers from the Shinjuku terminus.

Station layout
The station consists of two opposed side platforms serving two tracks, which are connected to the station building by a footbridge.

Platforms

History
Fujisawa-Hommachi Station was opened on April 1, 1929. It is located near the site of the original Fujisawa-shuku on the old Tōkaidō, from which it takes its name.

Passenger statistics
In fiscal 2019, the station was used by an average of 21,694 passengers daily.

The passenger figures for previous years are as shown below.

Surrounding area
Shirahata Shrine
Kanagawa Prefectural Shonan High School
 Kanagawa Prefectural Fujisawa Seiryu High School

See also
 List of railway stations in Japan

References

External links

  

Railway stations in Kanagawa Prefecture
Railway stations in Japan opened in 1929
Odakyū Enoshima Line
Railway stations in Fujisawa, Kanagawa